The 1990 WASFL season was the 106th season of senior Australian rules football in Perth, Western Australia. It saw the league, already realising that the damage from the admission to the VFL of  would be permanent rather than temporary as was hoped in 1986, rebrand itself as the Western Australia State Football League, but the move was unsuccessful and reversed after a single season. The refusal of WASFL clubs to permit an Eagles reserves team in the WASFL and the WAFC's refusal to accept one in the AFL's reserve grade competition led to further problems when Claremont said they would not play West Coast discards in the league team and produced a short-lived draft for such players, whilst at the same time Claremont rejected a proposed draft for the numerous young footballers who came from Perth's private schools but when not boarding lived in rural areas.

In anticipation of an AFL move planned in 1995 but not executed until 2000, the WASFL abolished the 50:50 sharing of gate revenue to allow the home team to keep all gate receipts. This helped some clubs like South Fremantle and Swan Districts, but along with the diversion of their former $250,000 league dividend to pay for the Eagles’ licence had a severe effect off-field for struggling Perth, who announced in June they had to raise $100,000 to avoid folding at the end of the season.

The WASFL during the pre-season made a number of moves designed to resurrect its flagging appeal, including a television campaign aimed at the younger generation and a sponsorship deal with Pepsi. The league also adopted sponsorship naming for the first time and called itself the ‘Pepsi Cup’ for three seasons. To avoid conflict with television broadcasts of West Coast games, the WASFL played finals on Sunday for the first time, and the experiment was accepted despite attendances considered "poor".

On the playing field, 1990 saw the Gerard Neesham-coached Claremont become the first team since South Fremantle between 1950 and 1953 to record four consecutive minor premierships, only to be beaten for the fourth time in five encounters by a Swan Districts team boosted by the return of John Todd who had coached the Swans to a hat-trick of premierships in the middle 1980s. East Perth, after five years with only twenty-four victories from 105 matches and being lucky to not suffer four wooden spoons, returned to their former home of Perth Oval, cleaned out many of their established senior players and rose to fifth in a season with such a pronounced gap between the finalists and also-rans that the four was mathematically sealed with three rounds to go. On the other hand, West Perth, after the previous season making only its third finals series since 1978, lost their entire ruck and most of their goal-to-goal line and plummeted to its first wooden spoon since 1974 and only its second since 1939. A controversy over the clearance of Stephen Walsey (whose application was rejected by WASFL commissioner Brian Sierakowski but transferred after a fee was negotiated), Angelo del Borello and Frank del Casale from East Perth did not help the Falcons, but they did win only their second – and last as of 2014 – Colts premiership.

Home-and-away season

Round 1

Round 2

Round 3 (Easter weekend)

Round 4

Round 5

Round 6

Round 7

Round 8

Round 9

Round 10 (Foundation Day)

Round 11

Round 12

Round 13

Round 14

Round 15

Round 16

Round 17

Round 18

Round 19

Round 20

Round 21

Ladder

Finals

First semi-final

Second semi-final

Preliminary final

Grand Final

Notes
Brother of Essendon champion Michael Long.The sequence was the Royals’ longest losing sequence since their record of fifteen straight losses in 1929.Schmidt had actually trialled for Essendon in practice matches before the 1986 VFL season but his commitments made it impossible for him to sign a contract.Barry Cable was the first, in the nineteenth round of 1979. Both figures include games played for VFL clubs (North Melbourne and Geelong)Swans’ reserves lost to South Fremantle by two points in that grade's preliminary final.

References

External links
Official WAFL website
Western Australia State Football League (WASFL), 1990

West Australian Football League seasons
WASFL